The Egypt national under-17 football team, nicknamed The Pharaohs, is the national team of Egypt and is administered by the Egyptian Football Association. The team was cancelled and as a result, Egypt withdrew from the 2013 African U-17 Championship qualification due to security reasons.

Tournament Records

FIFA U-16 and U-17 World Cup record

CAF U-17 Championship record

UNAF U-17 Tournament record

CAF U-16 and U-17 World Cup Qualifiers record

Arab Cup U-17 Tournament record

UNAF U-16 Tournament record 

 Red border color indicates tournament was held on home soil.
*Draws include knockout matches decided on penalty kicks.

See also
 Egypt national football team
 Egyptian Premier League
 Egypt Cup
 Egyptian Super Cup
 List of football clubs in Egypt

Egypt national football team
African national under-17 association football teams